The DECO Cassette System was introduced by Data East in October 1980. It was the first standardised arcade system that allowed arcade owners to change games. Developed in 1979, it was released in Japan in 1980 and then North America in 1981.

The arcade owner would buy a base cabinet, while the games were stored on standard audio cassette tapes. The arcade owner would insert the cassette and a key module into the cabinet. When the machine was powered on, the program from the tape would be copied into the cabinet's RAM chips; this process took about two to three minutes. Afterwards, the game could be played freely until the machine was powered off.

Game list
In bold characters are the video games that were also released in dedicated arcade cabinets.

 01: Highway Chase (also known as Mad Alien)
 02: Sengoku Ninja Tai (also known as Ninja)
 03: Manhattan
 04: Terranean
 05: Missile Sprinter
 06: Nebula
 07: Astro Fantasia
 08: The Tower
 09: Super Astro Fighter
 10: Ocean to Ocean
 11: Lock 'n' Chase
 12: The DECO Kid (also known as Flash Boy)
 13: Tournament Pro Golf (also known as Pro Golf or 18 Hole Pro Golf)
 14: DS Telejan
 15: Lucky Poker
 16: Treasure Island
 17: Bobitto
 18: Explorer
 19: Disco No. 1 (also known as Sweet Heart)
 20: Tornado
 21: Mission-X
 22: Pro Tennis
 23: 18 Challenge Pro Golf
 24: Tsumego Kaisyou
 25: Angler Dangler (also known as Fishing)
 26: BurgerTime (also known as Hamburger)
 27: Bump 'n' Jump (also known as Burnin' Rubber)
 28: Cluster Buster (also known as Graplop)
 29: Rootin' Tootin' (also known as La-Pa-Pa)
 30: Skater
 31: Pro Bowling
 32: Night Star
 33: Pro Soccer
 34: Super Doubles Tennis
 35: Bumpoline (also known as Flying Ball)
 36: Genesis (also known as Boomer Rang'r)
 37: Zeroize
 38: Scrum Try
 39: Peter Pepper's Ice Cream Factory
 40: Fighting Ice Hockey
 41: Oozumou - The Grand Sumo
 42: Hellow Gateball
 43: Kamikaze Cabbie (also known as Yellow Cab)
 44: Boulder Dash
 UX-7: Tokyo MIE Shinryoujo (Tokyo MIE Clinic)
 UX-8: Tokyo MIE Shinryoujo 2 (Tokyo MIE Clinic 2)
 UX-9: Geinoujin Shikaku Shiken
 ??: Burmazon

Reception
In Japan, the Game Machine list of highest-grossing arcade video games of 1981 listed Pro Golf at number three and Tele-Jan at number thirteen. On the list of highest-grossing arcade video games of 1982, Burnin' Rubber (Bump 'n' Jump) was number nine, BurgerTime (Hamburger) was number eleven, and Pro Tennis was number fifteen. Game Machine later listed Pro Soccer as the top-grossing new table arcade cabinet in September 1983, and Scrum Try topped the table arcade game chart in April 1984.

Legacy
It was the first interchangeable arcade system board, developed in 1979 before it was released in 1980. It inspired Sega's Convert-a-Game system, which released in 1981. Later interchangeable arcade systems followed from other companies, such as the Nintendo VS. System in 1984.

The DECO Cassette System was revolutionary for its time; but Data East discontinued it in 1985 due to arcade owners' complaints about the potential unreliability of both the tapes (which could be demagnetized easily) and key modules (which EPROMs went bad after a time), as well as the poor quality of most of its games and the medium's long loading times. Despite its bad qualities, the DECO Cassette System was better received in Japan, where many more games were released for it.

John Szczepaniak of Hardcore Gaming 101 considers the DECO scrolling action game Flash Boy (1981), based on the manga and anime series Astro Boy (1952–1968), to be sophisticated for its time. It had an energy bar that gradually depletes over time, and some of which can be sacrificed for temporary invincibility. It had punch attacks rather than shooting, and a type of combo mechanic where, when an enemy explodes, debris can destroy other enemies. There is also a boss battle at the end of each level, as well as bi-directional side-scrolling similar to Defender. Data East released two versions of the game, a side-scrolling version and a vertical scrolling version.

See also
 Arcade conversion
 Neo Geo (system)
 Nintendo VS. System
 Nintendo Super System
 PlayChoice-10

Notes

References

External links
 Data East DECO Cassette System at System16 - The Arcade Museum
 DECO cassette system at coinop.org
 DECO Cassette System at UVList

Arcade system boards
Data East video games